Ayr, Muhammad Madarkicis Hiraab is a Somali clan, part of the larger Habar Gidir Hawiye clan.
Ayr has two full siblings Sifaadle Madarkicis And Saruur Madarkicis.

Clan tree
Ali Jimale Ahmed outlines the Hawiye clan genealogical tree in The Invention of Somalia:
 Samaale
 Irir
 Hawiye
 Gugundhabe
 Baadicade
 Gorgate
 Hiraab
 Mudulood
 Abgaal
 Harti
 Angonyar
 Warsangeli
 Abokor
 Wabudhan
 Da'oud
 Rer Mattan
 Mohamed Muse
 Wa'esli
 Wacdaan
 Moobleen
 Ujajeen
 Duduble
 Habar Gidir
 Sacad
 Saleebaan
 Ayr
 Saruur
Sifaadle

Prominent figures 
Abdiqasim Salad Hassan, president of Somalia from 2000 to 2004
Hasan Adan Samatar, Somali singer, guitarist and theatrical performer
Magool, Somali singer
Yusuf Garaad Omar, Somali journalist, diplomat and politician, Somali Minister of Foreign Affairs
Aden Hashi Farah, former leader of al-Shabaab, the youth movement of the Islamic Courts Union
 Hassan Dahir Aweys, head of the 90-member Shura council of the Islamic Courts Union, Leader Hizbul Islam
Yusuf Mohammed Siad Inda'ade, head of security affairs for the Islamic Courts Union, Somali defence minister (TFG).
Mahad Mohamed Salad, State Minister for Presidential Palace

References

Hawiye clan